Zist-e Khavar (literally Life of the East) is the first tower complex containing a shopping centre located in Mashhad, Iran. It is a mega-scale multi-purpose complex consisting of shopping outlets, a cinema, an indoor theme park, banks, restaurants, and offices. It is located in a famous area for tourists and pilgrims in Mashhad. The building was founded in 1983, the owners were Mr. Javad & Mr. Mohammad Babajan. The head of the project was Mr. Khousro Sharifpour, in company of many architects, one of which was Mr. Kiumarth Bayat.

External links
Official website

Skyscraper office buildings in Iran
Buildings and structures in Mashhad
Retail buildings in Iran